Hamilton Township is the name of three townships in the U.S. state of Indiana:

 Hamilton Township, Delaware County, Indiana
 Hamilton Township, Jackson County, Indiana
 Hamilton Township, Sullivan County, Indiana

Indiana township disambiguation pages